Acacia laccata is a shrub belonging to the genus Acacia and the subgenus Juliflorae that is endemic to northern Australia.

Description
The dark brown bark is flaky and longitudinally fissured. It has glabrous, coarse, angular upper branchlets. The evergreen glabrous phyllodes have a narrowly elliptic and rarely oblanceolate shape that becomes oblique towards the base. It blooms from May to September producing yellow flowers. After flowering linear seed pods form that are constricted between the seeds.

Distribution
It is native to a small area in the Kimberley region of Western Australia where it is found on flats and plains growing in sandy soils over and around quartzite and sandstone. Its range extends eastwards into tropical parts of the top end in the north east of the Northern Territory and the far north west of Queensland where it is often part of open Eucalyptus forest communities.

See also
 List of Acacia species

References

laccata
Acacias of Western Australia
Plants described in 1964
Taxa named by Leslie Pedley
Flora of the Northern Territory
Flora of Queensland